Kara Lynn Joyce (born October 25, 1985), is an American former competition swimmer and four-time Olympic silver medalist.  She competed as a member of the United States Olympic Team at the 2004, 2008 and 2012 Olympics.

Early years
Joyce was born in Brooklyn, New York.  She split her high school years between Irondequoit, New York at Eastridge High School, Webster, New York and Ann Arbor, Michigan, where the family relocated to in 2001.  It was in Ann Arbor that Joyce began training with Club Wolverine under Jon Urbanchek.  Joyce also chose to compete for her high school team, the Ann Arbor Pioneers.  In her senior year of high school, she set five Michigan high school state records, four of which were national high school records at the time.  (Her state records are in the 50-yard, 100-yard and 200-yard freestyle as well as the 200-yard and 400-yard freestyle relays.  While only able to swim a total of four events, Joyce set the 50-yard freestyle record by leading-off the 200-yard freestyle relay.)

In total, Joyce broke five national high school records.

College career
Joyce attended the University of Georgia (UGA), where she swam for coach Jack Bauerle's Georgia Bulldogs swimming and diving team in National Collegiate Athletic Association (NCAA) and Southeastern Conference (SEC) competition from 2004 to 2007.  During her first year, Joyce won two individual NCAA championships (50-meter and 100-meter freestyle, short course), and helped Georgia to its third consecutive national runner-up finish.  As a sophomore, she along with junior Mary DeScenza led Georgia to its first NCAA Women's Swimming and Diving Championship in four years and defended her individual titles in the 50-yard and 100-yard freestyle, as well as adding a fourth place in the 200-yard freestyle.  Joyce was also a key swimmer on four of Georgia's five NCAA Championship relays.  En route to their victory, the Bulldogs became the first team in NCAA swimming history to win all five relays.

During the 2006 NCAA Championships, contested at UGA's Gabrielsen Natatorium, Joyce led the Bulldogs to a second-place finish with five NCAA titles and Swimmer of the Year honors.  On the first day of the meet, she broke the American record in the 50-yard freestyle, previously held by former Bulldog Maritza Correia.  Joyce defended her 100-yard freestyle title and added to that with a win in the 200-yard freestyle.  By winning all three, she became the first swimmer in the 25-year history of the Women's NCAA Championships to win the 50-yard, 100-yard, and 200-yard freestyle events.

Joyce earned All-American honors three consecutive years.  She was the recipient of the 2006–07 Honda Sports Award for Swimming and Diving, recognizing her as the outstanding college female swimmer of the year.

International career

2004 Athens Summer Olympics

At the 2004 Summer Olympics, Joyce earned a pair of silver medals as a member of the 4×100-meter freestyle and the 4×100-meter medley relays.  In her individual events, Joyce finished fifth in both the 50-meter and 100-meter freestyle races.

2005 World Aquatics Championships
At the 2005 World Aquatics Championships, Joyce received a bronze medal competing in 4×100-meter freestyle relay.

2007 World Aquatics Championships

2008 Beijing Summer Olympics
At the 2008 Beijing Olympics, Joyce once again earned a pair of silver medals as a member of the 4×100-meter freestyle and the 4×100-meter medley relays. In her individual event, Joyce finished sixth in the 50-meter freestyle.

2012 Summer Olympics

At the 2012 United States Olympic Trials in Omaha, Nebraska, the qualifying meet for the U.S. Olympic team, Joyce qualified for her third Olympics by finishing second in the 50-meter freestyle with a time of 24.73 seconds. Additionally, she placed 18th in the heats of the 100-meter freestyle.

At the 2012 Summer Olympics in London, Joyce posted a time 25.28 seconds in Heat 8 of the 50-meter freestyle, forcing her into a swim-off with two other competitors for the sixteenth and final spot in the 50-meter semi-finals.  Spurred on by the home crowd, British competitor Amy Smith won the swimoff with a time of 24.82, ending Joyce's participation in the event.

LEAD Sports Summit

Founded in 2016, The LEAD Sports Summit is a yearly summit that connects young female athletes with Olympic champions and experts through an all-inclusive, 4-day event. Girls learn from speakers and experts through both large keynotes and smaller breakout sessions. Throughout the weekend, girls also engage in hands-on leadership activities, group discussions, and reflection exercises. Each participant is part of a Team Leader group - Team Leaders are the women who serve as the “point person” for the girls during the Summit.

Past speakers include: Elizabeth Beisel, Missy Franklin, McKenzie Coan, Maya Dirado, Dr. Megan Cannon, Christen Shefchunas, Toni Armstrong, Jen Brunelli, Madisyn Cox, Eva Fabian, Natalie Hinds, Alicia Kendig Glass, Katie Meili, Lia Neal, and Hali Flickinger.

Locations:
 2017 - Texas
 2018 - Atlanta, Georgia
 2019 - Atlanta, Georgia
 2020 - Denver, Colorado
 2021 - Denver, Colorado

LEAD Sports Academy

Created in the fall of 2018 and launched in 2020 during the pandemic, The Lead Sports Academy offers in-depth courses taught by experts in Confidence, Leadership, Sport Psychology, and more. In addition to the courses, the Academy will also offer a membership, where course experts will lead interactive, 8-week sessions through individual courses. At the conclusion of each 8 week course,  experts will continue to provide exclusive course materials, discussion boards, monthly Q&As, and special guest speaker workshops for members.

 The Confidence Course - the flagship course with Coach Christen Shefchunas, launched on May 25, 2020.
 The Leadership Course - with Toni Armstrong, launched on August 23, 2020.
 The Sport Psychology Course - with Dr. Megan Cannon, will launch in November 2020.

See also

 Georgia Bulldogs
 List of Olympic medalists in swimming (women)
 List of United States records in swimming
 List of University of Georgia people
 List of World Aquatics Championships medalists in swimming (women)
 "Touch the Wall" (2014 documentary film about Kara Lynn Joyce and Missy Franklin in their training to the 2012 Summer Olympics)

References

External links
 
 
 
 
 
 
 

1985 births
Living people
American female freestyle swimmers
Georgia Bulldogs women's swimmers
Olympic silver medalists for the United States in swimming
Sportspeople from Ann Arbor, Michigan
Sportspeople from Brooklyn
Swimmers at the 2003 Pan American Games
Swimmers at the 2004 Summer Olympics
Swimmers at the 2008 Summer Olympics
Swimmers at the 2012 Summer Olympics
World Aquatics Championships medalists in swimming
Medalists at the FINA World Swimming Championships (25 m)
Medalists at the 2008 Summer Olympics
Medalists at the 2004 Summer Olympics
Pan American Games gold medalists for the United States
Pan American Games medalists in swimming
Medalists at the 2003 Pan American Games